Greg Mackenzie (born 7 December 1967) is a New Zealand cricketer. He played in seventeen first-class matches for Wellington from 1990 to 1993.

See also
 List of Wellington representative cricketers

References

External links
 

1967 births
Living people
New Zealand cricketers
Wellington cricketers
Cricketers from Brisbane